Loft Story was a French reality show, and it is the first French adaptation of Big Brother franchise. The show generally considered is the first of its kind in France. Loft Story  presented by Benjamin Castaldi and broadcast on M6 from 26 April 2001 to 5 July 2001 for the first season and from 11 April 2002 to 4 July 2002 for the second season.

The French title of the show is a play-on-words on loft because the contestants are "locked up" in a loft during their adventure, and Love Story.

The initial Loft Story inspired the creation of a similar show of the same name in Quebec. The famous eye logo is used by both Loft Story versions. It evokes the voyeuristic eye of the television viewer as she or he watches the Lofteurs live in front of the cameras. Some of them get gradually voted off the show by viewers on their phones and the last couple win a house. It caused great controversy in France and the house was attacked by protesters.

Production

Format 
Loft Story is a slightly re-tooled version of the Original Big Brother, toned down slightly for the French market by production company Endemol.

Eleven singles cut off from the outside world and must live in a loft where all rooms (except toilets and a room imposed by the CSA) are equipped with 26 cameras (including 3 infrared cameras, mostly hidden behind one-way mirrors) and microphones. They are filmed 24 hours a day.

Broadcast 
The live stream is slightly delayed on one or more paid channels of the TPS offer, as well as on the Internet during the first season. A daily program is broadcast after editing this live footage.

Presentation 
The show was presented by Benjamin Castaldi. Two hosts co-hosted the live show from the loft: Marie Guillaumond in 2001 and Séverine Ferrer in 2002.

In 2002, during the second season, there was also a show presented by Max and broadcast on Saturday at 23:55 summarizing the events of the week and welcomed the evicted contestants.

Series overall

Season 1
Start Date: 26 April 2001
End Date: 5 July 2001
The prize: 3,000,000-franc₣ worth house (€450,000)

Nominations table
All Housemates entered on Day 1 except for Fabrice and Kimy who entered on Day 7 and Day 11 respectively.

The contestants released a music single under the name 'Les Lofteurs'; 'Up and Down' reached number one in the French charts.

Season 2
Start Date: 11 April 2002
End Date: 4 July 2002
Prize: €250,000 + €250,000

Nominations table
All Housemates entered on Day 1 except for Lauryne and Romain who entered on Day 7 and Day 14 respectively.

Criticism

Loft Story became a craze when it was screened, but as it went on, it became extremely criticized, mocked and belittled by the media: the premise of ordinary young people being filmed most of the time in a cozy loft (and letting themselves out, they got a reputation of being stupid), being voted off by people on phones and getting to win money at the end, got it called high-rated "garbage tv".

Loft Story is considered to be the precursor of reality shows in France where the contestants get voted off by viewers.

Like other Big Brother-style programs, the show's sexual content was criticized as several contestants were seen having intercourse on camera.

See also
 Culture of France
 List of French television series
 List of French adaptations of television series from other countries
 Reality television

References

External links
Official website of Loft Story

French reality television series
2001 French television series debuts
2001 French television series endings
Big Brother (France)
M6 (TV channel) original programming